Calomicrus is a genus of beetles belonging to the family Chrysomelidae.

Species
Species in the genus include:
 Calomicrus pinicola

References

Galerucinae
Chrysomelidae genera
Taxa named by Lewis Weston Dillwyn